Loch Dochard is an upland freshwater loch lying approximately  west of Bridge of Orchy in Argyll and Bute, Scottish Highlands. The loch was surveyed on 18 May 1903 by Sir John Murray and later charted as part of his Bathymetrical Survey of Fresh-Water Lochs of Scotland 1897-1909.

References 

Dochard